Holdyn Jerian Grant (born October 9, 1992) is an American professional basketball player for Türk Telekom of the Basketbol Süper Ligi (BSL). He played college basketball with the University of Notre Dame and was considered one of the top college players in the nation for the 2014–15 season. After being selected with the 19th overall pick by the Washington Wizards in the 2015 NBA draft, his rights were sent to the Atlanta Hawks and then moved again to the New York Knicks on draft night.

College career
After a high school career at prep power DeMatha Catholic High School, Grant came to Notre Dame to play for coach Mike Brey.  After redshirting his freshman season, Grant was named to the Big East Conference All-Rookie team after averaging 12.3 points and 4.97 assists per game. In his second season with the Irish, Grant was named second-team All-Big East after averaging 13.3 points and 5.5 assists per game.

After the 2012–13 season, Notre Dame moved from the Big East to the Atlantic Coast Conference (ACC).  Based on his strong sophomore campaign, Grant was voted onto the preseason All-ACC team. Grant had a strong start to the season, leading the Fighting Irish at 19.01 points per game during their 8–4 start. But on December 23, 2013 Grant was ruled academically ineligible for the rest of the season and forced to withdraw from Notre Dame. Grant chose to return to Notre Dame rather than declare his eligibility for the 2014 NBA draft.

Grant returned to Notre Dame for the 2014–15 season.  Grant immediately helped the Fighting Irish to a 20–3 start and Grant personally had a breakout season as the leader of the team's highly efficient offense. He was named to the midseason watch lists for the John R. Wooden Award and the Oscar Robertson Trophy. The Grant-led Irish finished the year with a 32–6 record and an ACC Tournament championship; they advanced to the Elite 8 in the Midwest Region, where they lost to an undefeated Kentucky team by 2 points.

Professional career

New York Knicks (2015–2016)
Grant was selected the 19th overall pick by the Washington Wizards in the 2015 NBA draft. His rights were subsequently traded to the Atlanta Hawks before finally being traded to the New York Knicks in exchange for Tim Hardaway Jr. He later joined the Knicks for the 2015 NBA Summer League where he averaged 11.8 points, 3.2 rebounds and 4.8 assists in five games. On July 30, 2015, he signed his rookie scale contract with the Knicks. On December 2, he tied his season-high of 12 points in a win over his brother Jerami and the Philadelphia 76ers. On January 12, 2016, he had a season-best game with 16 points and 8 assists in a 120–114 win over the Boston Celtics.

Chicago Bulls (2016–2018)
On June 22, 2016, Grant was traded, along with José Calderón and Robin Lopez, to the Chicago Bulls in exchange for Derrick Rose, future teammate Justin Holiday and a 2017 second-round draft pick. The following month, he helped the Bulls win the Las Vegas Summer League championship game and earned MVP honors for his 24 points, 10 rebounds, and five assists. On November 15, 2016, he made his first start of the season and had 18 points and five steals in a 113–88 win over the Portland Trail Blazers. On November 26, he was assigned to the Windy City Bulls, Chicago's D-League affiliate. He was recalled on November 27, reassigned on December 9, and recalled again on December 10. On April 10, 2017, he had 17 points and a career-high 11 assists in a 122–75 win over the Orlando Magic.

On November 26, 2017, Grant scored a career-high 24 points in a 100–93 loss to the Miami Heat. On December 29, 2017, he had 11 points, 12 assists and seven rebounds as a starter in a 119–107 win over the Indiana Pacers. On January 22, 2018, he had 22 points and 13 assists in a 132–128 double overtime loss to the New Orleans Pelicans.

Orlando Magic (2018–2019)
On July 7, 2018, Grant was traded to the Orlando Magic in a three-team deal. On June 30, 2019, Grant did not receive a qualifying offer from the Magic, making him an unrestricted free agent.

Capital City Go-Go (2019–2020)
On November 18, 2019, Capital City Go-Go announced that they had added Grant off of waivers. On January 15, 2020, Grant scored 28 points and added seven rebounds, seven assists and one block in a win over Raptors 905. Grant averaged 16.3 points and 5.9 assists per game.

Washington Wizards (2020)
On July 1, 2020, Grant was signed by the Washington Wizards.

On December 1, 2020, Grant was signed by the Houston Rockets. He was waived on December 16.

Promitheas Patras (2020–2021)
On December 31, 2020, Greek club Promitheas Patras announced that they had signed Grant. There, he would be joining his older brother, Jerai. In 27 games in the Greek Basket League, Grant averaged 14.8 points, 4.2 rebounds and 6.7 assists.

Olimpia Milano (2021–2022)
On July 1, 2021, Grant officially signed a two-year deal with Olimpia Milano of the Lega Basket Serie A and the EuroLeague, under coach Ettore Messina. On July 2, 2022, he parted ways with the Italian club, having won both domestic titles during his stint.

Türk Telekom (2022–present)
On July 14, 2022, he has signed with Türk Telekom of the Basketbol Süper Ligi (BSL).

Career statistics

NBA

Regular season

|-
| style="text-align:left;"| 
| style="text-align:left;"| New York
| 76 || 6 || 16.6 || .394 || .220 || .780 || 1.9 || 2.3 || .7 || .1 || 5.6
|-
| style="text-align:left;"| 
| style="text-align:left;"| Chicago
| 63 || 28 || 16.3 || .425 || .366 || .890 || 1.8 || 1.9 || .7 || .1 || 5.9
|-
| style="text-align:left;"| 
| style="text-align:left;"| Chicago
| 74 || 26 || 22.8 || .415 || .324 || .745 || 2.3 || 4.6 || .9 || .1 || 8.4
|-
| style="text-align:left;"| 
| style="text-align:left;"| Orlando
| 60 || 1 || 15.7 || .418 || .364 || .650 || 1.6 || 2.6 || .7 || .1 || 4.2
|-
| style="text-align:left;"| 
| style="text-align:left;"| Washington
| 6 || 0 || 13.3 || .370 || .250 || .714 || 1.0 || 1.5 || .2 || .2 || 4.2
|- class="sortbottom"
| style="text-align:center;" colspan="2"| Career
| 279 || 61 || 17.9 || .411 || .323 || .770 || 1.9 || 2.9 || .7 || .1 || 6.1

Playoffs

|-
| style="text-align:left;"| 2017
| style="text-align:left;"| Chicago
| 5 || 2 || 10.4 || .261 || .111 || 1.000 || .8 || 1.0 || .4 || .0 || 3.2
|-
| style="text-align:left;"| 2019
| style="text-align:left;"| Orlando
| 3 || 0 || 4.7 || .200 || .000 || 1.000 || 1.3 || 1.0 || .0 || .0 || 1.7
|- class="sortbottom"
| style="text-align:center;" colspan="2"| Career
| 8 || 2 || 8.3 || .242 || .063 || 1.000 || 1.0 || 1.0 || .3 || .0 || 2.6

College

|-
| style="text-align:left;"| 2011–12
| style="text-align:left;"| Notre Dame
| 34 || 33 || 36.2 || .380 || .354 || .819 || 2.9 || 5.0 || 1.3 || .2 || 12.3
|-
| style="text-align:left;"| 2012–13
| style="text-align:left;"| Notre Dame
| 35 || 34 || 36.3 || .406 || .344 || .737 || 2.9 || 5.5 || 1.3 || .2 || 13.3
|-
| style="text-align:left;"| 2013–14
| style="text-align:left;"| Notre Dame
| 12 || 12 || 35.6 || .518 || .408 || .865 || 2.5 || 6.2 || 2.0 || .3 || 19.0
|-
| style="text-align:left;"| 2014–15
| style="text-align:left;"| Notre Dame
| 38 || 38 || 37.1 || .478 || .316 || .780 || 3.0 || 6.7 || 1.7 || .5 || 16.5
|- class="sortbottom"
| style="text-align:center;" colspan="2"| Career
| 119 || 117 || 36.4 || .436 || .345 || .790 || 2.9 || 5.8 || 1.5 || .3 || 14.6

Personal life
Jerian Grant is the son of former National Basketball Association (NBA) player Harvey Grant. He has two brothers who play basketball professionally – oldest brother Jerai has played in several leagues around the world and younger brother Jerami plays for the Portland Trail Blazers. Youngest brother Jaelin has followed his three older brothers to DeMatha, where he is completing his senior season. His uncle and father's identical twin Horace Grant was an NBA All-Star and won four championships with the Chicago Bulls and Los Angeles Lakers. Grant also has two sons, Hunter Jrue and Harper Jrex Grant.

References

External links

 Notre Dame Fighting Irish bio
 
 

1992 births
Living people
21st-century African-American sportspeople
African-American basketball players
All-American college men's basketball players
American expatriate basketball people in Greece
American expatriate basketball people in Italy
American men's basketball players
Basketball players from Maryland
Capital City Go-Go players
Chicago Bulls players
DeMatha Catholic High School alumni
New York Knicks players
Notre Dame Fighting Irish men's basketball players
Olimpia Milano players
Orlando Magic players
People from Bowie, Maryland
People from Silver Spring, Maryland
Point guards
Promitheas Patras B.C. players
Shooting guards
Sportspeople from Montgomery County, Maryland
Washington Wizards draft picks
Washington Wizards players
Windy City Bulls players